The 2012–13 Eintracht Braunschweig season is the 118th season in the club's football history. In 2012–13 the club plays in the 2. Bundesliga, the second tier of German football. It is the club's second consecutive season in this league, having played at this level since 2011–12, after it was promoted from the 3. Liga in 2011.

The club also took part in the 2012–13 edition of the DFB-Pokal, the German Cup, where it reached the second round and subsequently lost to Bundesliga side SC Freiburg.

Review and events
Due to the ongoing rebuilding of the Eintracht-Stadion, the stadium's capacity is reduced during the season.

Eintracht Braunschweig started the season by winning five games in a row and taking over first place in the league on the second matchday. The club never left the direct promotion spots for the rest of the season. After having spent the last two decades mostly between the second and third division of German football, Eintracht's resurgence became noted by the German media. On the 31st matchday, the club secured its return to the Bundesliga after a 28-year absence with a 1–0 away win over FC Ingolstadt. Damir Vrančić scored the decisive goal from a free-kick in injury time.

With 19 goals, Dominick Kumbela also finished as the top-scorer of the 2. Bundesliga.

Matches and results

Legend

Friendly matches

2. Bundesliga

DFB-Pokal

Players

Current squad

Summer transfers

In:

Out:

Winter transfers

In:

Out:

Management and coaching staff 

Since 12 May 2008 Torsten Lieberknecht is the manager of Eintracht Braunschweig.

References

External links 
Eintracht Braunschweig Official Website
 2012–13 Eintracht Braunschweig season at Weltfussball.de 
 2012–13 Eintracht Braunschweig season at kicker.de 
 2012–13 Eintracht Braunschweig season at Fussballdaten.de 

German football clubs 2012–13 season
2012-13